Afonso II was a ruler of the Kingdom of Kongo in 1561.

Biography
Little is known about Afonso II or his reign.  Duarte Lopes told Filippo Pigafetta the Italian humanist who composed a description of Kongo in 1591 that Diogo I's succession was disputed by three pretenders, His son, who few favored was immediately killed, and a second person was elected favored by the majority of the people, but the Portuguese in the capital murdered him , while the party of the second king murdered the Portuguese favorite and then set out a general massacre of Portuguese. However, contemporary records support a different course of events, the first elected king, Afonso II, ruled only a few days, though he had Portuguese support and was overthrown as being illegitimate by Bernardo.

No contemporary sources mention Afonso II by name, perhaps because his reign was so short, but his name appeared on a list of kings written by Antonio da Silva, a Kongo historian who served as Duke of Mbamba in 1617.

See also
 Kingdom of Kongo
 List of Manikongos of Kongo

References

Manikongo of Kongo
16th-century monarchs in Africa
Year of birth unknown
Year of death unknown